Den stora dagen may refer to:

A song, see Den stora dagen
Another name of Vikingarna's 1982 album Kramgoa låtar 10
2006 Mats Bergmans album, see Den stora dagen (Mats Bergmans album)